Zifal (also Romanized as Zīfal and Zeyfel; also known as Zeynal and Zīnal) is a village in Alishervan Rural District, in the Sivan District of Ilam County, Ilam Province, Iran. At the 2006 census, its population was 101, in 20 families. The village is populated by Kurds.

References 

Populated places in Ilam County
Kurdish settlements in Ilam Province